Mal-e Mohammad Abdal Ali (also Romanized as Māl-e Moḩammad ʿAbdāl ʿAlī; also known as  Mal Mohammad Abd Ali, Māl-e ‘Abd ‘Alī, Māl-e Moḩammad, and Moḩammad ‘Abd ‘Alī) is a village in Hayat Davud Rural District, in the Central District of Ganaveh County, Bushehr Province, Iran. At the 2006 census, its population was 37, in 9 families.

References 

Populated places in Ganaveh County